Ilemela is an Ward and the headquarter of the Ilemela District in the Mwanza Region of Tanzania with a postcode number 33205. In 2016 the Tanzania National Bureau of Statistics report there were 25,240 people in the ward, from 43,244 in 2012.

Villages 
The ward has 9 villages.

 Ilemela
 Balyeheye
 Nyangungulu
 Bukengwa
 Kahasa
 Mwambani
 Butuja
 Sabasaba
 Madukulu

References

Wards of Mwanza Region
Ilemela District
Constituencies of Tanzania